Co-Counselling International (CCI) is an international peer network of co-counsellors (spelled co-counseling and co-counselors in US English).

History 
Co-Counselling International (CCI) was started in 1974 as breakaway from Re-evaluation Counseling by John Heron who was at the time director of the Human Potential Research Project, University of Surrey UK, and Tom and Dency Sargent from Hartford (Conn., USA). (First published by Human Potential Research Project, University of Surrey, Guildford in 1974) The CCI break was ideological and CCI developed in significantly different ways in practice, theory and organisation.

The first gatherings of CCI co-counsellors took place in 1974 in the USA and in Europe and annual international gatherings have taken place in both locations since then.  The European gatherings currently rotate between Germany, Hungary, Ireland, The Netherlands and UK.

John Heron's status within the network has always been as an equal member, although inevitably as a founder member, activist for some 15 years and the person who developed much of the thinking behind CCI there was a certain amount of transference on to him. He now lives in New Zealand and has an involvement with the CCI network there.

There is no imperative in CCI to evangelise and so the network has spread somewhat slowly and haphazardly.  In the USA the network existed for many years mainly in and around Connecticut but it is now spreading to other parts of the country. Outside of Europe and the USA the main development has been in New Zealand where there is now an active network and they hold their own series of international gatherings.

Practice 

In CCI the person in the client role is wholly in charge of the session.  The counsellor only intervenes in accordance with one of three levels of “contract” - free attention, normal and intensive – which are defined in CCI's principles. The only requirement of the counsellor is that they give “free attention” - that is full supportive attention – to the client. The other two contracts constitute invitations to the counsellor to make interventions from within those permitted if they feel it is appropriate. Clients in CCI may and do draw on a wide range of therapeutic activities that can be used self-directedly as well as the cathartic discharge - re-evaluation activities.

Organisation 
CCI is a peer network with no core structure, classes and activities are organized by individuals or groups acting self-directedly.  The network consists of individuals and groups who agree to a set of ideas about what CCI is.  Although it has no formal status, the principles outlined in A Definition of CCI  have stood the test of time as a necessary and sufficient statement of those ideas.

Organisation within the network varies from place to place.  In some parts of the world there are structured organisations at national or local level, or both, with a variety of organizational structures and requirements for membership, e.g. the payment of subscriptions, in addition to being members of CCI.  In other places the network has no fixed structure and co-counsellors organise in an ad hoc way.

The network is currently active in Germany, Hungary, Ireland, Israel, The Netherlands, New Zealand, UK and USA.  There are also groups or contacts in Australia, Belgium, Canada, France, Iceland and Spain.

Members of the active parts of the network generally organise local and national gatherings of co-counsellors in addition to the international gatherings.  These gatherings are usually self-creating, in other words there is no pre organised programme, facilitators or speakers.  Facilitation rotates between volunteers or sometimes even plenary sessions are peer facilitated.  Plenary sessions are mainly about organising the business of the day, as part of which anyone who wants to suggest or offer to facilitate a "workshop" explains their idea.  The workshops cover a wide range of topics from applying co-counselling to a range of issues e.g. depression or gender issues, to trying out other approaches to personal development such as meditation or cognitive behavioural therapy.  Some of the sessions may be training, e.g. in assertiveness, while others may be for games, music or dance.  Generally there is a choice of things to do, including having co-counselling sessions or just socialising.  The events generally have to be self-financing with the participants paying the costs of accommodation, food and any necessary administration.

In addition to these events, individuals or groups of co-counsellors organise a range of ad hoc themed or facilitated activities.  These can range from residential training courses for which the facilitator would be paid to day or half day sessions on a theme such as money or eating.

A number of local newsletters are produced to keep co-counsellors in contact, let them know about events and spread news, ideas and experiences.  The practice is not to edit contributions to these newsletters and they may contain personal experiences as well as private lists of co-counsellors.  For these reasons they are generally confidential and not available to non co-counsellors.  CCI does, however, have a fairly active public web presence.

Culture 

CCI has no rules to cover anything outside of co-counselling sessions, so the manner in which co-counsellors relate to one another is up to them.  New co-counsellors are usually alerted to the possibility that they may develop strong feelings about people they counsel with and are advised to stick to co-counselling with them until they have a clearer idea about what is going on.  Gatherings of co-counsellors are somewhat like temporary intentional communities and co-counsellors generally seem to be able to relate and organise very effectively in a no rules environment.

In principle, i.e. according to the principles of CCI, any CCI co-counsellor may teach it.  In practice local organisations tend to exercise oversight over people teaching in their area and people offering to teach are expected to have some training.  In addition, people putting themselves forward to teach CCI co-counselling are generally publicly known (a number are listed on CCI websites) and are open to be challenged by anyone who has concerns about what they are doing. 

Supervision of activities in the network occurs along panocratic lines (see panocracy), in other words it is the responsibility of all CCI co-counsellors.  An important way that this takes place is through local, national and international gatherings of co-counsellors.  In general these gatherings are open to all members of CCI so that even local events may be attended by co-counsellors from other parts of the country or the world.  Any differences are usually highlighted at these events and resolved through creative problem solving.

References 

 .

External links 
 Co-Counselling International (CCI)
 Selection of CCI co-counselling manuals

Psychotherapy organizations
Counseling organizations